The 1996 Arena Football League season was the tenth season of the Arena Football League. It was succeeded by 1997. The league champions were the Tampa Bay Storm, who defeated the Iowa Barnstormers in ArenaBowl X. The AFL finally stabilized its scheduled number of games. It expanded to a 14-game season, which would remain until 2003. Previously, the scheduled number of games had not stayed the same for more than three years.

Team movement
The Texas Terror joined the league as an expansion team.

Meanwhile, the Fort Worth Cavalry were relocated to Minneapolis and became the Minnesota Fighting Pike; the Las Vegas Sting moved to Anaheim, California, becoming the Anaheim Piranhas, and the Miami Hooters were renamed to the Florida Bobcats. The franchise rights to the Denver Dynamite were sold and the team announced they would return in 1997 as the Nashville Kats

Standings

Playoffs

All-Arena team

References